James Gyakye Quayson (born 9 October 1952) is a Ghanaian politician who currently serves as the Member of Parliament for the Assin North constituency.
Controversy: in violation of article 92 2a of Ghana’s constitution, a person shall not be qualified to be a member of parliament if he owes allegiance to a country other than Ghana. In a ruling therefore in April 2022, the Supreme Court of Ghana stripped Quayson of his position.

Early life and education
Quayson was born on 9 October 1952 and hails from Assin Bereku in the Central Region of Ghana. He holds a bachelor's degree in Social Sciences and a master's degree in Urban Planning and Community Development.

Career 
Prior to being in parliament, he worked as a District Manager for the City of Toronto Employment and Social services.

Politics
Quayson is a member of the National Democratic Congress and currently the member of parliament for Assin North Constituency in the Central Region of Ghana.

Challenge to membership of parliament 
In December 2020, a resident of Assin Bereku, Michael Ankomah-Nimfah filed a petition at the Cape Coast High Court questioning the eligibility of Quayson to be the MP for Assin North due to him being a dual citizen of Canada and Ghana at the time he filed his papers at the Electoral Commission of Ghana to stand in the 2020 Ghanaian general election. According to the Ghanaian constitution, no person with dual nationality may hold office in government or parliament. The court upheld the petition and ordered a by-election for Assin North. Quayson went to the Appeal Court to challenge the ruling. He continued to sit in parliament and this was challenged within the house as well. The Supreme Court by a 5-2 majority decision ruled that he should stop holding himself as a member of parliament. He has indicated his intention to contest the Supreme Court ruling.

Committees 
Quayson is a member of the Privileges  Committee and also a member of the Local Government and Rural Development Committee.

Personal life 
Quayson is a Christian.

References 

1952 births
Living people
National Democratic Congress (Ghana) politicians
Ghanaian MPs 2021–2025
York University alumni